The Rudrapatnam Brothers are an Indian Carnatic vocal duo, consisting of brothers R. N. Thyagarajan and Dr. R. N. Tharanathan. The brothers come from a family of musicians from Rudrapatna village off the Kaveri banks in Arkalgud Thaluk of Hassan district in the southwest Indian state of Karnataka. Vocalist Tiger Varadachariar, on seeing the musical atmosphere there, once claimed that "Rudrapatnam is the Thanjavur of Karnataka". Music, Veda adhyayana, and studying Sanskrit were integral parts of their family tradition.

They have the honour, as first Carnatic Vocal duo to receive the third highest civilian award of the country "Padma Sri" by the Government of India for the year 2018.

Their musical journey spans more than sixty years with thousands of concerts and with hundreds of sishyas around the globe.

Early life and career
They are grandsons of R. K. Krishna Sastry, a musician, Harikatha exponent, playwright and a Sanskrit and Kannada scholar. They are sons of R. K. Narayana Swamy, a disciple of Musiri Subramania Iyer, the doyen of Carnatic music. Their uncles are R. K. Venkatarama Sastry, R. K. Ramanathan and Sangita Kalanidhi Padma Bhushan Dr. R. K. Srikantan.

They were initiated into Carnatic music and trained by their father and Sastry, the famous violinist and disciple of Sangita Kalanidhi Mysore T. Chowdiah.

Education
Thyagarajan earned a M.Sc. in mathematics and worked as a lecturer in mathematics for several years before joining All India Radio in 1976. He was the Assistant Director, Chennai Doordarshan Kendra and retired as Deputy Director, Doordarshan Kendra, Bangalore in 2003.

Tharanathan earned a M.Sc. and Ph.D. in organic chemistry and was a Chemistry Lecturer and retired as Additional Director, Department of Biochemistry and Nutrition in Central Food Technological Research Institute (C.F.T.R.I), Mysore. He was a visiting professor and Fellow at Max Planck Society, Germany and a recipient of Alexander Von Humboldt Fellowship. He has visited Germany several times and worked on research projects.

Musical career
One review saw the brothers as deeply influenced by their predecessors, describing their music as adhering to the tradition of Carnatic music.
They claim influences from Sri Semmangudi Srinivasa Iyer, Sri G.N.Balasubramaniam (GNB), Sri Ramnad Krishnan and Sri Tanjavur S Kalyanaraman.

They claim the tradition of Saint Thyagaraja Swamy Sishya Parampara in more than one way. Musiri, their guru’s guru belongs to the sishya lineage of Manambuchaavadi Venkatasubbayyar. Sastry was a sishya of Veena Subbanna who was part of the Walajapet sishya parampara and sishya of Mysore Sadasiva Rao.

They emphasize the music of Nayaki, Varali, Begada, Mukhari, Sahana, Madhyamavathi and Thodi.

Concerts
They began their concert career in 1956 and since then performed regularly around the world. They have given performances across India accompanied by artists such as Lalgudi Jayaraman, M. S. Gopalakrishnan, V.V. Subramanyam, M. Chandrasekaran, Ramanathapuram C. S. Murugabhoopathy, T. K. Murthy, Palghat R. Raghu, Umayalpuram K. Sivaraman, Vellore Ramabhadran, Karaikudi Mani, V. Kamalakar Rao, Trichy Sankaran, Srimushnam V. Raja Rao, K.S. Manjunathan, V. Harishankar and T. H. Vinayakaram.

In 2016, the Rudrapatnam Brothers received the coveted Central Sangeet Natak Academy Award from the honourable President of India Shri Pranab Mukherjee. In 2017, the brothers received prestigious "Sangeetha Kala Acharya" Award from the Madras Music Academy.

Awards

References

Singers from Karnataka
Indian musical duos
21st-century Indian male classical singers
People from Hassan district
Male Carnatic singers
Carnatic singers
Recipients of the Padma Shri in arts
20th-century Indian male classical singers
Recipients of the Sangeet Natak Akademi Award